Nirmala Sahariya is a member of the Rajasthan Legislative Assembly representing the Kishanganj (Rajasthan Assembly constituency) of Rajasthan. She won the 13th and 15th House Rajasthan Legislative Assembly election.

References 

Living people
1976 births
Rajasthan MLAs 2008–2013
Rajasthan MLAs 2018–2023